Yevgeniy Abramovich (born 17 September 1995) is a Belarusian professional footballer who plays for Torpedo-BelAZ Zhodino.

References

External links 
 
 

1995 births
Living people
People from Barysaw
Sportspeople from Minsk Region
Belarusian footballers
Association football goalkeepers
FC Torpedo-BelAZ Zhodino players
FC Smolevichi players
FC Arsenal Dzerzhinsk players